Time was a rock band from Yugoslavia that was formed in 1971 by Dado Topić (vocals) after leaving his previous band Korni Grupa. The original lineup consisted of, in addition to Topić, Tihomir "Pop" Asanović (organ), Vedran Božić (guitar), Mario Mavrin (bass), Ratko Divjak (drums) and Brane Lambert Živković (piano and flute). Time frequently changed lineup and after three albums and many tours disbanded in late 1977 and Dado Topić started his solo career. In 1998 and 2001, Time reunited to play a limited number of live concerts. Now they still play together as a rock trio.

Time played a style of progressive rock with some jazz influences, perhaps similar to musical notions expressed by King Crimson, Genesis or Steely Dan. The first album has a prominent Hammond organ, piano and flute. "Time II" has a harder sound and includes several ballads. The third album may be considered to have a jazz-funk production style. The most popular songs were "Da li znaš da te volim", "Rock 'n' roll u Beogradu", "Istina mašina" and others.

Discography

Albums
 "Time" (1972), (Jugoton) / (Croatia Records)
 "Time II" (1975)
 "Život u čizmama sa visokom petom" (1976)

Singles
 1973: "Život moj / Pjesma No.3" (Jugoton)
 1973: "Reci Ciganko, što mi u dlanu piše / Makedonija" (Jugoton)
 1975: "Kad jednom otkrijem čovjeka u sebi / Da li znaš da te volim" (PGP RTB)
 1976: "Tin i Tina / Dok sjedim ovako u tvojoj blizini" (PGP RTB)
 1976: "Kad smo ja i moj miš bili bokseri / Dok ja i moj miš sviramo jazz" (PGP RTB)
 1976: "Poželi nešto / Superstar" (PGP RTB)

Compilation albums
 "Time & Dado Topić - Ultimate Collection" (2007), (Croatia Records)

References

Grupa Time 

Croatian rock music groups
Croatian progressive rock groups
Musical groups established in 1971
Musical groups disestablished in 1977
Yugoslav progressive rock groups